SCSN can refer to:

Southern California Seismic Network
Supreme Council for Sharia in Nigeria